Okino-Klyuchi (Okhin Bulag) is a rural locality (a selo) in Bichursky District, Republic of Buryatia, Russia. The population was 1,066 as of 2010. There are 8 streets.

Geography 
Okino-Klyuchi is located 37 km west of Bichura (the district's administrative centre) by road. Starye Klyuchi is the nearest rural locality.

References 

Rural localities in Bichursky District